SV Arminia Hannover is a German association football club based in Hanover, Lower Saxony.

History 

The club was founded in 1910 as FC Arminia Hannover and merged with Rugby-Verein Merkur in 1918, becoming SV Arminia-Merkur. Two years later they renamed themselves SV Arminia Hannover and captured the North German title. Through the 1920s and 1930s the club grew to include a number of other sports, but the football side did not earn any significant result, apart from the 1932–33 season when the club, under the English coach William Townley, advanced as far as the quarterfinals of the German Championship, where they were ousted by the eventual winners Fortuna Düsseldorf. During the Third Reich, the club played in the Gauliga Niedersachsen, later the Gauliga Südhannover-Braunschweig, generally as a top of the table side without winning another local championship.

For the most part, the club played second tier ball through the 1950s and 1960s with their best performances a pair of first-place finishes in the Regionalliga Nord in 1966 and 1967. An amateur championship in 1975 led Arminia to four seasons in the 2. Bundesliga Nord. They barely managed to hang on each year until finally slipping to the Amateur Oberliga Nord (III) in 1980. The side faded away over the next two decades, playing a roughly even number of seasons in tiers III and IV, until they were relegated from the now-defunct Oberliga Nord (IV) in 2007. In 2008–09 they played in the Niedersachsenliga (West, V) but were relegated again.

In June 2010, though, they managed to come back by winning the Bezirksoberliga (District Premier League) title and successfully competing in the relegation/promotion play-offs. So Arminia played in the new Niedersachsenliga (V) in 2010–11, where they were sent back after a 15th-place finish to the Landesliga Hannover (VI) for three seasons until they won the 2013–14 title to return to the Niedersachsenliga.

Honours 
The club's honours:
 Northern German champions
 Champions: 1920
 Regionalliga Nord
 Champions: 1967, 1968
 Landesliga Hannover
 Champions: 2010, 2014

Notable former players 
The list includes players with at least one cap for their country's senior national team.

  Bruno Akrapović
  Willi Fricke
  Edmund Malecki
  Werner Olk
  Josef Posipal
  Werner Schulz
  Lothar Ulsaß
  Eduard Wolpers
  Klaus Wunder

References 
 Horst Voigt: SV Arminia Hannover. Sutton Verlag, March 2003,

External links 
  
 Abseits Guide to German Soccer

Football clubs in Germany
Football clubs in Lower Saxony
Sport in Hanover
Association football clubs established in 1910
1910 establishments in Germany
2. Bundesliga clubs